Janowo (Kashubian: Janowò) is a village in the administrative district of Gmina Sierakowice, within Kartuzy County, Pomeranian Voivodeship, in northern Poland. The village has a population of 100.

References

Janowo